Rinku Kalsy is an Indian/Dutch documentary film director. She graduated in economics in Mumbai. And studied filmmaking in Amsterdam. Her debut as a director for the documentary film For the Love of a Man, about the fan clubs of Indian film star Rajinikanth, premiered at the 71st Venice International Film Festival. She lives between Mumbai and Amsterdam.

References

External links
 
 Instagram

Indian documentary filmmakers
Indian women film directors
Film directors from Mumbai
Year of birth missing (living people)
Living people
Women artists from Maharashtra
Indian women documentary filmmakers